Roc Oil Company Limited was an international petroleum company based in Sydney, Australia. The company was established in 1997 as a privately owned company by John Doran. In 1999, the company went public with an IPO at the Australian Stock Exchange, and in 2004, Roc was listed on the London Stock Exchange. In 2008, Roc Oil merged with Anzon Australia, and in 2014 China's Fosun International conglomerate acquired Roc for AU$474 million.

Roc operated oil production facilities in Mauritania, Angola, Malaysia, and China, and in 2013, its last full year of independent operation, produced 2.7 million barrels of oil or equivalent products.

Company History 
Founder – John Doran

John Doran was the CEO and founder of Roc Oil Company from 1999 to 2008, ending due to an untimely passing. Doran had extensive experience in both geology as well as being classified as an 'oil man' after large involvement in the expansion of gas exploration and production across Europe, the Middle East and Australia. Proceeding the start-up of Roc Oil Company, Doran was the managing director of Command Petroleum where before departing managed the sale of Command to London Stock Exchange (LSE) listed company Cairn Energy in 1996.

Inception of Roc Oil Company

Following Doran's involvement with Command Petroleum, he started the Roc Oil Company in 1996, which was a private start-up company with the aims of exploring opportunities for gas and oil exploration, production and development in Australia, Asia, parts of Africa and the Middle East. Up until 1999 the company owned no assets, no working capital, and no partners. In 1999 the Roc Oil listed on the Australian Stock Exchange (ASX) through an initial public offering (IPO), raising AU$150 million. Roc Oil utilised these funds to acquire a range of oil and gas assets in Eastern England and in the UK North Sea. The core of these assets was the Saltfleetby Gas Field in Lincolnshire, which was underdeveloped later becoming one of the largest onshore gas field in the UK.

In mid-2008 John Doran passed away after a sudden illness at 62 years of age. Roc Oil's Chief Operating Officer Bruce Clement took charge on a temporary basis following the passing of Doran. Doran was mourned by his close family including his wife and two children. After two months as Acting CEO of Roc Oil Company, Clement was appointed as chief executive officer. ROC Chairman, Andrew Love stated, "the board had completed an external search for candidates and is confident that Bruce is the best person to lead the company."

Major Capital Raisings and Mergers & Acquisitions

2001 
In April 2001, Roc Oil Company made a friendly unsolicited offer to acquire 40% of Canadian gas and oil exploration company, Gulfstream Resources Canada Ltd for C$1.10 per share of Gulfstream's outstanding common stock, approximately 25.7 million shares. The offer was valued at C$28.3 million, however was rejected by the Gulfstream. The Gulfstream chairman J. Angus McKee made a statement following the offer, stating "We do not welcome the Roc Oil offer, which we believe to be opportunistic and unrealistic".

2004 
To further fuel the next stage of Roc Oil Company's growth Strategy, Roc Oil raised A$92 million through a 3 for 5 share rights issue, priced at $1.40 per share  issuing 61,316,462 new shares (approximately 93% of the new issue). This was underwritten by Goldman Sachs JBWere Pty Ltd, who gained ownership of the remaining 7% of shares not purchased through the issue as per the underwriting agreement .

Following this capital raise in April, In December Roc Oil announced the sale of 100% of the subsidiary which owned the Saltfleetby Gas Field (acquired in 1999) for A$110 million (44-million-pound equivalent). The sale was estimated to earn Roc Oil 28.5 million pounds after tax profit for 2005. The buyer of the subsidiary was Wingas, a joint venture between Wintershall AG (a German producer of oil and gas) as well as OAO Gazprom (Russian gas company and one of the largest in the world). The funds earned from the sale will be used to finance ROC's development of the Chinguetti Oil Field, offshore Mauritania and the Cliff Head Oil Field, Offshore Western Australia and other ventures ROC was planning to explore.

2006 
In June, ROC began further expanding its presence in Asia by planning to make a move to acquire a 24.5% stake in a China Oil Field off Apache (hydrocarbon explorer).

2008 
To refine ROC's focus in terms of geographic operations, the company was planning on selling off its North Sea and Africa assets. ROC had a 12.5% stake in the Blane Oil Field (Located in the North Sea) and because of drilling uncovering mostly dry wells, CEO Bruce Clements stated the company will aim to sell off these assets in order to refocus ROC's efforts in currently occupied territories including Asia and Australia.

ROC became interested in taking over a local crude oil producer in Australia, Anzon. The acquisition would double ROC's crude oil reserves, with ROC having already taken control of 69% of the company and the CEO at the time confident in the offer stating "the deal will happen". In September, the shareholders of the UK located Anzon Energy approved of the A$600 million merger with ROC Oil. The merger granted ROC control of 53.1% stake of Anzon Australia (AZA.AU) and the off-market offer made for Anzon Australia will be declared unconditional as part of this deal. ROC stated, "the merger would remove single asset risk to Anzon shareholders as well as create significant upstream oil and gas company in Australia." ROC's payment was via share's finalised offering being 1.32 ROC shares for every AEL share.

2014 - ROC Acquired by Fosun International 
Horizon Merger Proposition

Prior to Fosun's acquisition of ROC, Horizon Oil Limited announced a proposed merger of equals with ROC. The proposed merger was valued at A$800 million with Horizon shareholders owning 58% of the entity emerging from the merger and ROC shareholders with 42%. The deal aimed to allow ROC to operate in areas which it was not currently present, however would be attractive such as Malaysia and PNG, as larger companies were beginning to exit these areas. As well, the new entity would be able to produce between 15,000 and 20,000 barrels of oil a day approximately until 2030.

Fosun Acquisition

However, before the merger process was completed with Horizon, Transcendent Resources (a subsidiary of Fosun International)  sent an off-market takeover bid for ROC Oil Company. Subsequently, ROC accepted the offer by Transcendent Resources, stating it offered better synergies and benefits to the be created group over the deal proposed by Horizon as well as offered a better premium over the share price. The ROC Oil Chairman Mike Harding stated, "the proposal to purchase all of ROC's shares for cash is superior when considered against the alternative merger of equals with Horizon and offers a significant premium to share price performance". The final offer by Fosun was A$474 million, paying A$0.69 per ROC Oil Company share, at the time being a 10 percent premium to the current share price and a 23 percent premium to the price prior to the announcement of the offer. Fosun commented on their rationale behind the transaction saying "to enable the group to enter the upstream oil & gas industry and acquire oil & gas assets."

2015 to Present 
Sale of Cliff Head Oil Field

In 2017 ROC executed a share purchase agreement with Triangle (Perth Basin) and Royal Energy to sell of its 42.5% share of Cliff Head Oil Field. Total consideration paid for the share of the oil field was US$3,750,000. The divestment was completed in order to provide cash in the business to invest in other areas of exploration, mainly China.

Acquire Interest in Ungani Oil Field

ROC Oil Company acquired 50% interest in the Ungani Oil Field located in Western Australia as well as 50% interest in the exploration permits from Buru Energy. The compensation paid for both the oil field as well as the exploration permits combined was a maximum of A$84 million. $60 million for the oil field as well as funding 80% of the first A$25 million exploration costs, being a maximum of A$20 million. The acquisition was completed in order to further support ROC's presence in Australia as stated by the CEO.

Mining Operations

Beibu Gulf

2006 
In 2006 ROC commenced drilling a side-track appraisal well in the Beibu Gulf region, off shore China. in preliminary tests the discovery well unearthed a combined 5,700 b/d of oil from three columns.

2014 
ROC Oil continued mining operations in the Beibu Gulf in 2014, drilling two exploration wells finding oil in one of the two wells. The wells were drilled to a depth of 1406 metres, "where the basement granite has been intersected". ROC further drilled a side track to an aggregate depth of 1,265 metres which further confirmed the presence of oil in the very top of the Jiaowei formation. ROC CEO, Alan Linn said the "discovery adds potentially valuable incremental oil to the larger project". The wells were plugged and abandoned on 27 September 2014.

Australia

Western Australia - Perth 
In  2007, ROC made a discovery of oil and gas in their Dunsborough well in an offshore Perth Basin which is 37.5% owned by ROC. The Dunsborough well was the third and final well the program which commenced in April 2007. The first well, Frankland discovered gas and the second, Perseverance too discovered gas. CEO at the time, Doran commented on the discoveries saying "Frankland and Dunsborough look as if they have the best chances of being developed, while Perseverance will probably need a lot of good things to happen around it if it is going to make the grade".

The Frankland well, the first well of the operation located offshore Perth was shortly plugged and abandoned, labelled as a small gas discovery. This was done in support of the companies strategy to target oil. Additionally, the company also said "whether or not an associated oil log is present needs to be evaluated and if an oil leg exists, it is likely to be small".

Western Australia - Canning Basin 
ROC Oil has current operations still in Western Australia, in the canning basin located in the northern region of WA being the Ungani Oil Field. the field is owned 50/50 by Roc Oil Company and Buru Energy Limited and is a producer of oil. the field produces approximately 850 bopd gross crude oil from a total of five wells, This oil is exported to a terminal in Wyndham and stored as well as exported by ship. The first two wells were drilled in 2015, and followed by an additional two in May 2018.

Angola

Cabinda 
ROC Oil Company were approved as the operator for the Cabinda Well in Angola in 2001. ROC gained a 45% interest in the onshore block, where more than 4.5 billion barrels (bbl) have already been discovered during the last 40 years. In 2008 the fifth well, Coco discovered oil and associated gas during a test. At the time there was sceptical views held of the area and the amount which could be produced with BBY analyst Scott Ashton commenting "There was a pre-drill expectation that Coco was going to be smaller". However CEO Doran stated the company had different expectations saying "we don't know the size, which is why we didn't comment on it".

However, in later 2008 in October, ROC plugged and abandoned the first appraisal well in Angola. The project was less successful than anticipated, with the five of the seven wells in the drilling program failing to find commercial quantities of oil. While the company did abandon the well, it was announced that the company would plan to re-enter the Angola project, specifically the Coco well in order to test and find oil in the future.

ROC Oil Company's Responsibility

Health, Safety and Environment Committee 
ROC Oil Company established the Health, Safety and Environment Committee in 2012 in order to meet the company's obligations to the environment and the safety of their employees as well as assist with the development of policies, procedures and practises. The committee is made up of at least two directors (independent directors), the CEO and the Corporate HSE Manager as well as an appointed chairman.

The main responsibilities of the committee outlined in their charter is:

 review the status of the company's HSE
 monitor the company's processes that ensure compliance with HSE regulations
 review reports from and responses to significant HSE incidents

References

External links
 

Oil companies of Australia
Defunct oil companies
Defunct oil and gas companies of Australia
Australian companies established in 1997
Energy companies established in 1997
Non-renewable resource companies established in 1997
Energy companies disestablished in 2014
Australian companies disestablished in 2014
Non-renewable resource companies disestablished in 2014